The Society of Saint Pius V (SSPV), is a traditionalist Catholic society of priests, formed in 1983, and based in Oyster Bay Cove, New York, United States. The society broke away from the Society of Saint Pius X (SSPX) over liturgical issues. 

The SSPV regards the questions of the legitimacy of the present Catholic Church hierarchy and the possibility that the Holy See is unoccupied (sedevacantism) to be unresolved, and that the SSPV itself lacks the authority to resolve the question, but is practically sedevacantist. The society is headed by one of its co-founders, Bishop Clarence Kelly, and named after Pope Pius V, who promulgated the Tridentine Mass.

History

Founding

The SSPV developed out of the Society of St. Pius X (SSPX), the traditionalist organization founded in 1970 by Archbishop Marcel Lefebvre. In 1983, Lefebvre expelled four priests (Clarence Kelly, Daniel Dolan, Anthony Cekada, and Eugene Berry) of the SSPX's Northeast USA District from the society, partly because they were opposed to his instructions that Mass be celebrated according to the 1962 Roman Missal issued by John XXIII. Other issues occasioning the split were Lefebvre's order that Society priests must accept the decrees of nullity handed down by diocesan marriage tribunals and the acceptance of new members into the group who had been ordained to the priesthood according to the revised sacramental rites of Pope Paul VI.

"The Nine" (the four expelled priests plus five who voluntarily left the SSPX) refused to accept Lefebvre's insistence on the 1962 Missal even though they were aware of his position before they were ordained. It was their opinion that it included departures from the liturgical traditions of the church (for example, inserting the name of Saint Joseph after that of the Blessed Virgin Mary in the Canon of the Mass). According to the now-Bishop Donald Sanborn (one of "the Nine" priests), Lefebvre was imposing these liturgical and disciplinary changes in view of a reconciliation with the Vatican. A more basic reason was the belief amongst The Nine that the men who had reigned as pope since the death of Pope Pius XII (d. 1958) had not been legitimate popes (Canon 1325, no. 2, 1917), although Cekada later stated that "...[t]he 'pope question' was not raised at the time, and was not at issue." They held that these popes had officially taught and/or accepted heretical doctrines, and therefore had lost or never occupied the See of Rome (Canon 188, no. 4, 1917). Like the Society of Saint Pius X, they believed that there had been novel interpretations of the traditional teachings of the church on issues such as religious liberty. One of The Nine, Dolan, admitted that while still a member of the SSPX, he had already concluded that the See of Peter was vacant.

The Nine set up a new priestly society under the leadership of Kelly, their former District Superior. The eight priests were Thomas Zapp, Donald Sanborn, Anthony Cekada, Daniel Dolan, William Jenkins, Eugene Berry, Joseph Collins, and Martin Skierka. Additional priests joined shortly thereafter.

Splits

Within a few years, about half of the original nine SSPV priests separated from Kelly. Most of them formed an openly sedevacantist group,  "Catholic Restoration", under the leadership of Dolan and Sanborn. Both were later consecrated as bishops in the episcopal lineage of the sedevacantist Vietnamese Archbishop Pierre Martin Ngô Đình Thục. The other priests founded independent ministries.

Cekada states that this resulted from the SSPV's intrinsic distrust of a centralized authority as existed in the SSPX, which makes the latter vulnerable to being "subverted with one stroke of a pen" to the Vatican. Rather than independent congregations being a weakness and something to be lamented, Cekada considers all such groups and priests taken together preferable to the SSPX, which has continued to hold negotiations with Rome and uses the 1962 Missal.

Episcopal orders
On 19 October 1993, Kelly was consecrated a bishop in Carlsbad, California, United States, by Bishop Alfredo Méndez-Gonzalez, the retired Bishop of Arecibo, Puerto Rico. Bishop Méndez had already publicly ordained Paul Baumberger and Joseph Greenwell, two seminarians of the SSPV, to the priesthood in 1990. Kelly's consecration was announced a few days after Méndez's death in 1995.

Structures
The SSPV currently has five permanent priories, and its priests serve a network of chapels, churches, and temporary Mass locations in 14 US states (as of 2020) and one Canadian province (Alberta). It operates only in North America.

Associated religious communities
The Daughters of Mary, Mother of Our Savior are a congregation of religious sisters founded by Kelly in 1984. Their congregation's motherhouse and novitiate are located in Round Top, New York, United States, in the Catskill Mountains area. The sisters have two additional houses in Melville, New York, and White Bear Lake, Minnesota where they run schools, and engage in other types of charity work, such as visiting nursing homes. The current mother general is Mother Mary Bosco.

The Congregation of Saint Pius V (CSPV) is a Society of Common Life for priests and coadjutor brothers, founded by Bishop Kelly in 1996. The CSPV was formed to provide a canonical structure for the incardination of priests and the affiliation of religious. The congregation operates Immaculate Heart Seminary in Round Top, New York, for its candidates, under the direction of Bishop James Carroll, CSPV. The seminary's graduates are ordained by Bishop Carroll, Bishop Santay, or Bishop Kelly. As of 2022, the CSPV has two bishops, eleven priests, and five brothers.

References

External links
Official website
Congregation of Saint Pius V website
Bishop Kelly's personal webpage (archived)

Traditionalist Catholicism
Christian religious orders established in the 20th century
Communities using the Tridentine Mass
Christian organizations established in 1983
Catholic dissident organizations
Second Vatican Council
Society of St. Pius V
Pius V
Society of Saint Pius X